Everybody Wins (French: Chacun sa chance) is a 1930 French-German comedy film directed by René Pujol and Hans Steinhoff and starring Renée Héribel, Gaby Basset and Jean Gabin. It was made as a co-production between France and Germany, with a separate German-language version Headfirst into Happiness also being shot using a different cast.

It was shot at Pathé's Joinville Studios in Paris. The film's sets were designed by the art director Jacques Colombier.

Synopsis
A shop salesman is mistaken for a baron, which in turns leads him to be more attractive to the woman he is in love with.

Cast
 Renée Héribel as La Baronne de Monteuil
 André Urban as Le Baron de Monteuil
 Gaby Basset as Simone
 Jean Gabin as Marcel Grivot
 Odette Josylla as Colette
 Jean Sablon as Jean d'Arthaud
 Hubert Daix as Directeur de magasin
 Raymond Cordy as Le pochard
 Germaine Laborde
 Hélène Christiane
 Josyane
 Jane Pierson
 Christiane Tourneur

References

Bibliography 
 Harriss, Joseph. Jean Gabin: The Actor Who Was France. McFarland, 2018.

External links 
 

1930 films
1930 comedy films
French comedy films
German comedy films
1930s French-language films
Films directed by René Pujol
Films directed by Hans Steinhoff
Films of the Weimar Republic
Pathé films
Films shot at Joinville Studios
1930s French films
1930s German films